Schedule 1 substances, in the sense of the Chemical Weapons Convention, are chemicals which can either be used as chemical weapons themselves or used in the manufacture of chemical weapons and which have no, or very limited, uses outside of chemical warfare.

These may be produced or used for research, medical, pharmaceutical or chemical weapon defence testing (called "protective testing" in the treaty) purposes but production above 100 grams per year must be declared to the OPCW in accordance with Part VI of the "Verification Annex". A country is limited to possessing a maximum of one tonne of these materials.

They are sub-divided into Part A substances, which are chemicals that can be used directly as weapons, and Part B which are precursors useful in the manufacture of chemical weapons. Examples are mustard and nerve agents, and substances which are solely used as precursor chemicals in their manufacture. A few of these chemicals have very small-scale non-military applications; for example, minute quantities of nitrogen mustard are used to treat certain cancers.

The Schedule 1 list is one of three lists. Chemicals which can be used as weapons, or used in their manufacture, but which have legitimate applications as well are listed in Schedule 2 (small-scale applications) and Schedule 3 (large-scale applications).

Guidelines for Schedule 1 

The following criteria shall be taken into account in considering whether a toxic chemical or precursor should be included in Schedule 1:
It has been developed, produced, stockpiled or used as a chemical weapon as defined in Article II;
It poses otherwise a high risk to the object and purpose of this Convention by virtue of its high potential for use in activities prohibited under this Convention because one or more of the following conditions are met:
It possesses a chemical structure closely related to that of other toxic chemicals listed in Schedule 1, and has, or can be expected to have, comparable properties;
It possesses such lethal or incapacitating toxicity as well as other properties that would enable it to be used as a chemical weapon;
It may be used as a precursor in the final single technological stage of production of a toxic chemical listed in Schedule 1, regardless of whether this stage takes place in facilities, in munitions or elsewhere;
It has little or no use for purposes not prohibited under this Convention.

Toxic chemicals 
O-Alkyl (<C10, incl. cycloalkyl) alkyl (Me, Et, n-Pr or i-Pr)-phosphonofluoridates, e.g. 	 
Sarin: O-Isopropyl methylphosphonofluoridate 
Soman: O-Pinacolyl methylphosphonofluoridate 

O-Alkyl (<C10, incl. cycloalkyl) N,N-dialkyl (Me, Et, n-Pr or i-Pr) phosphoramidocyanidates, e.g. 
Tabun: O-Ethyl N,N-dimethylphosphoramidocyanidate 
O-Alkyl (H or <C10, incl. cycloalkyl) S-2-dialkyl (Me, Et, n-Pr or i-Pr)-aminoethyl alkyl (Me, Et, n-Pr or i-Pr) phosphonothiolates and corresponding alkylated or protonated salts, e.g. 
VX: O-Ethyl S-2-diisopropylaminoethyl methylphosphonothiolate

Sulfur mustards: 	 
2-Chloroethylchloromethylsulfide 
Mustard gas: Bis(2-chloroethyl)sulfide 
Bis(2-chloroethylthio)methane 
Sesquimustard: 1,2-Bis(2-chloroethylthio)ethane 
1,3-Bis(2-chloroethylthio)-n-propane 	
1,4-Bis(2-chloroethylthio)-n-butane 	
1,5-Bis(2-chloroethylthio)-n-pentane 	
Bis(2-chloroethylthiomethyl)ether 	
O-Mustard: Bis(2-chloroethylthioethyl)ether 	
 
Lewisites: 	 
Lewisite 1: 2-Chlorovinyldichloroarsine 	
Lewisite 2: Bis(2-chlorovinyl)chloroarsine 	
Lewisite 3: Tris(2-chlorovinyl)arsine 	
 
Nitrogen mustards: 	 
HN1: Bis(2-chloroethyl)ethylamine
HN2: Bis(2-chloroethyl)methylamine
HN3: Tris(2-chloroethyl)amine

Saxitoxin
Ricin
 Novichok agents: Р-alkyl (H or ≤C10, incl. cycloalkyl) N-(1-(dialkyl(≤C10, incl. cycloalkyl)amino))alkylidene(H or ≤C10, incl. cycloalkyl) phosphonamidic fluorides and corresponding alkylated or protonated salts
e.g. N-(1-(di-n-decylamino)-n-decylidene)-P-decylphosphonamidic fluoride
Methyl-(1-(diethylamino)ethylidene)phosphonamidofluoridate, also known as A-230

 Novichok agents: O-alkyl (H or ≤C10, incl. cycloalkyl) N-(1-(dialkyl(≤C10, incl. cycloalkyl)amino))alkylidene(H or ≤C10, incl. cycloalkyl) phosphoramidofluoridates and corresponding alkylated or protonated salts, e.g.
O-n-Decyl N-(1-(di-n-decylamino)-n-decylidene)phosphoramidofluoridate
Methyl (1-(diethylamino)ethylidene)phosphoramidofluoridate, also known as A-232
Ethyl (1-(diethylamino)ethylidene)phosphoramidofluoridate, also known as A-234.

 Novichok agents: Methyl-(bis(diethylamino)methylene)phosphonamidofluoridate
 Carbamates (quaternaries and bisquaternaries of dimethylcarbamoyloxypyridines) Quaternaries of dimethylcarbamoyloxypyridines: 
1-[N,N-dialkyl(≤C10)-N-(n-(hydroxyl, cyano, acetoxy)alkyl(≤C10)) ammonio]-n-[N-(3-dimethylcarbamoxy-α-picolinyl)-N,N-dialkyl(≤C10) ammonio]decane dibromide (n=1-8)
e.g. 1-[N,N-dimethyl-N-(2-hydroxy)ethylammonio]-10-[N-(3-dimethylcarbamoxy-αpicolinyl)-N,N-dimethylammonio]decane dibromide 
 Bisquaternaries of dimethylcarbamoyloxypyridines: 1,n-Bis[N-(3-dimethylcarbamoxy-α-picolyl)-N,N-dialkyl(≤C10) ammonio]-alkane-(2,(n-1)-dione) dibromide (n=2-12)
e.g. 1,10-Bis[N-(3-dimethylcarbamoxy-α-picolyl)-N-ethyl-N-methylammonio]decane-2,9-dione dibromide

Precursors 
	 	  	 
Alkyl (Me, Et, n-Pr or i-Pr) phosphonyldifluorides, e.g. 	 
DF: Methylphosphonyl difluoride 
  	  	 
O-Alkyl (H or <C10, incl. cycloalkyl) O-2-dialkyl (Me, Et, n-Pr or i-Pr)-aminoethyl alkyl (Me, Et, n-Pr or i-Pr) phosphonites and corresponding alkylated or protonated salts, e.g.	 
QL: O-Ethyl O-2-diisopropylaminoethyl methylphosphonite 
  	  	 
Chlorosarin: O-Isopropyl methylphosphonochloridate
Chlorosoman: O-Pinacolyl methylphosphonochloridate

See also 
Schedule 2
Schedule 3

References

External links
 Chemical Weapons Convention. Annex on Chemicals. A. Guidelines for Schedules of Chemicals // Organisation for the Prohibition of Chemical Weapons
 Chemical Weapons Convention. Annex on Chemicals. B. Schedules of Chemicals. Schedule 1, pdf // Organisation for the Prohibition of Chemical Weapons

Chemical weapons demilitarization
Lists of weapons
Schedule 1 substances (CWC)